Kimetto is a surname of Kenyan origin. Notable people with the surname include:

Alice Kimetto Chelangat (born 1976), Kenyan marathon runner
Dennis Kipruto Kimetto (born 1984), Kenyan marathon runner

Kalenjin names
Surnames of Kenyan origin